Mrs K is a 2016 Malaysian-Hong Kong crime action film directed by Ho Yuhang. It stars Kara Wai, Simon Yam, Wu Bai, Ruby Yap and Siow Li Xuan. This movie was only released in Moscow, Russia under the title: Миссис Кей (missis kei in Russian)

Premise
Mrs K is a story of a woman who gives everything that she has to protect her husband and daughter when enemies from her past come hunting her.  She is forced to revisit her dark past when her teenage daughter is kidnapped by enemies from her past.

Cast
 Kara Wai as Mrs K 
 Simon Yam as Scarface
 Wu Bai as Mr K 
 Siow Li Xuan as Little K 
 Faizal Hussein as Tano
 Tony Liu as Monkey
 Ruby Yap as Fong 
 Lenny Ooi as Loong
 Joe Chang as Blondie
 Germaine Yeap as Nikkie 
 Kirk Wong as Priest 
 Fruit Chan as Retiree 
 Dain Said as Loan shark
 Alvin Chong as Robbers 1
 Bernard Hiew as Robbers 2
 R. Ramasundran as Rajeev

Reception 
Variety called it "is a stylish action movie whose light touch persuades us to accept still-lethal potential of a nearly 60-year-old heroine" and "it's expertly crafted good fun that should appeal to genre fans across many borders."

Accolades

Singaporean and Russian release
In Singapore and Russia, the movie was released in 2018 under Mosfilm Asia.

References

External links
 
 
 
 

2016 films
2010s Mandarin-language films
2010s Cantonese-language films
Malaysian crime drama films
Malaysian action films
2016 crime drama films
Hong Kong crime drama films
Hong Kong crime action films
2016 crime action films
2016 action drama films
2010s Hong Kong films